The Dirty Energy Dilemma: What’s Blocking Clean Power in the United States is a 2008 book by academic Benjamin K. Sovacool, published by Praeger. In the book, Sovacool explores problems with the current U.S. electricity system and ways to overcome them.

Synopsis
In the first part of the book, Sovacool explores the problems with the current system of large-scale electricity generation being used in the United States, powered by fossil fuels and nuclear power reactors. He identifies "The Big Four Energy Challenges" as rising fossil fuel costs, increasing pollution, inefficient and brittle transmission networks, as well as widespread system vulnerability to natural disasters, sabotage, and financial manipulations. "The Big Four Clean Solutions" of renewable energy, efficient energy use, distributed generation, and combined heat and power will do a better job of providing needed energy while protecting consumers and the planet.

Sovacool suggests that the barriers to clean energy adoption are institutional, not technological, and he sees no role for nuclear power in a clean energy transition.

Award
The Dirty Energy Dilemma won a 2009 Nautilus Silver Award for Best Book in the "Ecology/Environment/Sustainability/Green Values" category.

See also

Alternative Energy: Political, Economic, and Social Feasibility
Brittle Power
Clean Edge
Clean Energy Trends
Greenhouse Solutions with Sustainable Energy
The Clean Tech Revolution

References

Further reading
Benjamin K. Sovacool and Marilyn A. Brown (Eds.) (2007). Energy and American Society: Thirteen Myths, Springer.
Miguel Mendonça, David Jacobs and Benjamin K. Sovacool, (2009). Powering the Green Economy: The Feed-In Tariff Handbook, Earthscan. 
Benjamin K. Sovacool (2010). Climate Change and Energy Security: A Global Overview of Technology and Policy Options, MIT Press.

Climate change books
Renewable energy commercialization
Environmental non-fiction books
Books about environmentalism
2008 non-fiction books
2008 in the environment
Books about energy issues